Jenchaña (possibly from Aymara Qinchaña, for to surround with bushes) is a volcano in the Andes of Peru, about  high. It is situated in the "Valley of the Volcanoes"  in the Arequipa Region, Castilla Province, Andagua District. Jenchaña lies northwest of Chilcayoc.

References

Mountains of Peru
Mountains of Arequipa Region
Volcanoes of Peru